Ed Vickers-Willis (born 28 March 1996) is a professional Australian rules footballer playing for the North Melbourne Football Club in the Australian Football League (AFL). He was drafted by North Melbourne with their third selection and thirty-sixth overall in the 2014 national draft. Vickers-Willis attended Melbourne Grammar School and was also captain of the school in 2014. He made his debut in the five point loss against  at Domain Stadium in round five of the 2017 season.

After rupturing his posterior cruciate ligament in Round 7, 2018, Vickers-Willis returned to senior football in Round 1 2019 against Fremantle. This was Vickers-Willis’ only match of the 2019 season due to an anterior cruciate ligament injury sustained in the first quarter. 

As of 2021, Vickers-Willis is a consultant at the Boston Consulting Group in Melbourne, Australia.

References

External links

1996 births
Living people
North Melbourne Football Club players
Werribee Football Club players
Sandringham Dragons players
Australian rules footballers from Victoria (Australia)
People educated at Melbourne Grammar School